Histidyl-tRNA synthetase  (HARS) also known as histidine-tRNA ligase, is an enzyme which in humans is encoded by the HARS gene.

Function 

Aminoacyl-tRNA synthetases are a class of enzymes that charge tRNAs with their cognate amino acids. The protein encoded by this gene is a cytoplasmic enzyme which belongs to the class II family of aminoacyl tRNA synthetases. The enzyme is responsible for the synthesis of histidyl-transfer RNA, which is essential for the incorporation of histidine into proteins. The gene is located in a head-to-head orientation with HARSL on chromosome five, where the homologous genes share a bidirectional promoter.

Clinical significance 

The gene product is a frequent target of autoantibodies in the human autoimmune disease polymyositis/dermatomyositis.

Interactions 

HARS has been shown to interact with EEF1B2 and EEF1G.

References

Further reading